Chawki Mejri (November 11, 1961 – October 10, 2019) was a Tunisian film director, noted for his films realisation in Syria and Egypt, best known  as the director of the Kingdom of Ants movie.

Biography 
Born November 11, 1961 in Tunis, he is a former student of Sadiki College, he took his master's degree in cinematography from the National Film School in Łódź in 1996.

Chawki spent most of his career in Syria and then in Egypt, where he became known for his dramatic television films including short films, yet in 2012  he directed a feature film about the Palestinian cause Kingdom of Ants which enumerates  the history of a family during the 2002 Palestine events, and highlights the difference between the reality and the dream.

On October 10, 2019 Chawki died of heart attack in a hospital in Cairo.

Personal life 
He was married to the Jordanian actress Saba Mubarak, with one son.

Filmography 
Feature film:

Awards 
 International Emmy Awards(2007)
 Adonia award (2008 and 2009)
 Officier (2016) and Commander (2019) of the Tunisian Order of Merit

References 

Tunisian film directors
2019 deaths
1961 births